"I Believe" is a song that was performed by the Canadian group Chilliwack. It was released on their 1981 album Wanna Be a Star.

In Canada, the song peaked at number 13 for two weeks. In the United States, it reached number 33 on the Billboard Hot 100 and number 29 on Cash Box.

In late 1981, the group performed "I Believe" on American Bandstand.

Chart performance

Weekly charts

Year-end charts

References

External links
 

1982 singles
1981 songs
Chilliwack (band) songs
Millennium Records singles